Heuchera maxima is a species of flowering plant in the saxifrage family, known by the common names island alum root, Channel Islands coral bells, and Jill of the rocks.

It is endemic to the four northern Channel Islands of California, within Channel Islands National Park. It grows on canyon cliffs in coastal sage scrub habitats.

Description
Heuchera maxima is a rhizomatous perennial herb growing a broad patch of large, rounded, multilobed green leaves with long petioles and a fringe of hairs along the edges. It grows  in height.

Each flower is rounded with fleshy white or pink lobes and tiny petals curling away from the center. The protruding stamens are tipped with large anthers.

Cultivation
Heuchera maxima is also cultivated as an ornamental plant for traditional, drought tolerant, native plant, and wildlife gardens. It prefers part shade, including as a groundcover in dry shade conditions under oaks.

See also
Flora of the Channel Islands of California
List of California native plants

References

External links

Jepson Manual Treatment — Heuchera maxima
Heuchera maxima — U.C. Photo gallery

maxima
Endemic flora of California
Natural history of the California chaparral and woodlands
Natural history of the Channel Islands of California
~
Garden plants of North America
Drought-tolerant plants
Groundcovers